The men's 4×7.5 kilometre relay at the 2003 Asian Winter Games was held on 7 February 2003 at the Iwakisan Sports Park, Japan.

Schedule
All times are Japan Standard Time (UTC+09:00)

Results

References

Results

External links
Schedule

Men relay